At the end of each season since 2006, MaxPreps has recognized the top high school basketball players in the United States with MaxPreps National Player of the Year honors going to the top male and female performers. In addition to the overall players of the year, the website recognizes top players from each class by naming a MaxPreps National Junior of the Year, Sophomore of the Year, and Freshman of the Year. The awards are typically announced in early April.

Many of the players recognized have gone on to standout college and NBA careers, including LaMelo Ball, Lonzo Ball, Paolo  Banchero, Kevin Love, Michael Porter Jr., Austin Rivers, Ben Simmons, Jayson Tatum and Zion Williamson.

WNBA stars Skylar Diggins, Sabrina Ionescu, Maya Moore, Chiney Ogwumike, Nneka Ogwumike, Breanna Stewart and A'ja Wilson are among the female selections.

Player of the Year

Boys 

Source:

Girls

Freshman of the Year

Boys 

Source:

Girls

Sophomore of the Year

Boys 

Source:

Girls

Junior of the Year

Boys 

Source:

Girls

References 

American basketball trophies and awards
High school basketball in the United States